The Shenandoah River  is the principal tributary of the Potomac River,  long with two forks approximately  long each, in the U.S. states of Virginia and West Virginia. The river and its tributaries drain the central and lower Shenandoah Valley and the Page Valley in the Appalachians on the west side of the Blue Ridge Mountains, in northwestern Virginia and the Eastern Panhandle of West Virginia. There is a hydroelectric plant along the Shenandoah river constructed in 2014 by Dominion.

Course
The Shenandoah River is formed northeast of Front Royal near Riverton, by the confluence of the South Fork and the North Fork. It flows northeast across Warren County, passing underneath Interstate 66  from its formation. Five miles (8 km) downriver from the Clarke County border, the Shenandoah passes under U.S. Route 50 and then passes through a triple bend.  below the Route 50 bridge, the river passes underneath State Route 7 and then continues northeast another  where it crosses into Jefferson County in West Virginia. Once in West Virginia the river completes six large bends before joining with the Potomac from the southwest near Harpers Ferry.

Geology

The Shenandoah Valley is underlaid by limestone. The fertile soil made it a favored place for early settlement.  It continues to be a major agricultural area of Virginia and West Virginia. Some karst topography is evident, and the limestone is honeycombed with caves.  Several have been developed as commercial tourist attractions, including Luray Caverns, Shenandoah Caverns, and Skyline Caverns.

On the riverbank a few miles above Harper's Ferry is said to be a cave with an opening just large enough for a mounted rider to squeeze through. It widened in the interior to a spacious room where hundreds of Col. John Mosby's raiding troops are said to have hidden from pursuing Union cavalry.

Environmental issues

Mercury contamination

The Shenandoah River was contaminated with mercury which was released by a DuPont rayon manufacturing facility located in Waynesboro, Virginia from 1929 to 1950. This mercury is still present in the fish population of the river today; data collected over the last several decades shows that mercury levels remain stable. The fish in many sections of the Shenandoah River are not safe for human consumption. For example, the Virginia Department of Health (VDOH) states that it is not safe to consume any species except trout which are caught between Waynesboro and Grottoes, Virginia due to elevated mercury levels. In general, the VDOH states that it is not safe to consume more than two fish per month which are caught on the Shenandoah River in Page, Warren, Augusta, or Rockingham counties.

In 2017 DuPont agreed to pay $42,069,916.78 to address natural resource damages and to implement restoration projects related to the impacted resources in the South Fork Shenandoah River watershed.

Fish Kills

Since 2005, the Shenandoah River has experienced several springtime fish kills that have affected several of its native fish species. In 2005, redbreast sunfish and smallmouth bass along a  stretch of the South Fork Shenandoah River began dying of lesions caused by bacteria and fungi.  Although the fish kill eventually wiped out 80% of the adult redbreast sunfish and smallmouth bass, juvenile populations appeared to be unaffected. The following year more-localized fish kills in Clarke County spread to two of the Shenandoah's three species of sucker: the shorthead redhorse and the northern hogsucker – the former suffering from similar lesions witnessed in the previous year's fish kill. Virginia's Department of Environmental Quality received reports of fish kills near Elkton and between Bentonville and Front Royal in late April 2007 and observed fish exhibiting lesions and strange behavior.

Etymology

Various accounts tell the origin of the name. According to one, General George Washington named the valley (and river) in honor of Skenandoa (or Shenandoah), an Oneida "pine tree chief" based in New York, who led hundreds of Oneida and Tuscarora warriors in support of the American rebels on the frontier during the Revolutionary War. He also sent much needed corn to Washington and his troops during their hard winter at Valley Forge, Pennsylvania in 1777–1778. However, the name was in use when Washington was a child, as evidenced in land grants and correspondence. It is also said to be named after the Senedo people, a little-documented tribe said to have lived on the north fork of the river and destroyed by the Catawba, some time between 1650 and 1700.

Recreation
The Shenandoah River is a very popular river for canoeing, river tubing, and white-water recreation such as rafting and kayaking (class I-III in season, II-III+ during the spring run-off), and several commercial outfitters offer a variety of guided trips and rentals.

South Fork Shenandoah River

The South Fork is formed at Port Republic in southern Rockingham County, by the confluence of the North River and South River.

South Fork tributaries

Bridges over the South Fork

North Fork Shenandoah River
At its formation, the principal feeder on the North Fork is the German River. The North Fork flows initially southeast, down from the mountains, then northeast through a valley across Shenandoah County, along the western side of Massanutten Mountain. It flows past Woodstock and Strasburg. On the north end of the ridge it turns briefly southeast to join the South Fork from the northwest to form the Shenandoah.

North Fork tributaries

Bridges over the North Fork

Shenandoah tributaries

West Virginia

Hog Run
Long Marsh Run
Bullskin Run
Evitts Run
Forge Run
Cattail Run
Flowing Springs Run
Stikeys Run
Double Run

Virginia

Happy Creek
Manassas Run
Venus Branch
Long Branch
Spout Run
Morgan Mill Stream
Chapel Run
Lewis Run
Craig Run
Dog Run
Spout Run
Wheat Spring Run
Passage Creek

In culture
The American folk song and sea chantey titled "Oh Shenandoah" has been adapted to explicitly reference the river or river valley, although earlier versions referred to the 18th century Oneida Chief Shenandoah and the Missouri River, 1,000 miles to the west.

The 1971 hit and signature song of John Denver, "Take Me Home, Country Roads", prominently mentions the Shenandoah River, and was adopted by the state of West Virginia in 2014 as its fourth official state song.

An episode of Star Trek: Deep Space Nine, continuing the tradition of naming their shuttles after rivers, has a shuttle named Shenandoah.

See also 

List of Virginia rivers
List of West Virginia rivers

References

External links

 Virginia Department of Game and Inland Fisheries - South Fork
 Friends of the North Fork Shenandoah River
 Shenandoah Riverkeeper

 
Rivers of Virginia
Rivers of West Virginia
Rivers of Page County, Virginia
Rivers of Rockingham County, Virginia
Rivers of Warren County, Virginia
Rivers of Shenandoah County, Virginia
Rivers of Jefferson County, West Virginia
Rivers of Clarke County, Virginia
Tributaries of the Potomac River